Malacca Chinese Mosque (Jawi: مسجد چينا نڬري ملاك) is a Chinese-style mosque in Krubong, Central Melaka District, Malacca, Malaysia. It is the third such mosque in Malaysia after the ones in Kelantan and Perak and was developed by the Malacca Chinese Muslim Association (Pertim). Its construction budget was approved by Deputy Prime Minister Muhyiddin Yassin in October 2011, while its construction was started in August 2012 by Warisan Harmoni Construction Sdn. Bhd. and completed in April 2014. The construction of the mosque cost , with  provided by the federal government and the remaining by Pertim and the public.

The mosque has a unique Chinese architecture design with pagodas and Chinese calligraphy from a combination of architectural design of several mosques in Beijing, Shanghai and Xi'an in China. It has one minaret tower and two domes and is equipped with the main prayer hall, library, multipurpose hall, offices, koi ponds and a restaurant inside.

See also

References

2014 establishments in Malaysia
Chinese architecture in Malaysia
mosques completed in 2014
mosques in Malacca